Kankareenjärvi is a small lake in Finland. It is situated in Salo in the region of Southwest Finland in the area of the former municipality of Halikko. Purilanjoki, a minor river that discharges into the Archipelago Sea, originates from the lake.

Kankareenjärvi is the only lake of Halikko. A pine forest surrounds the lake. The shores of the Kankareenjärvi are partly bog, especially in the north side of the lake. There are some summer cottages and a public beach at the lake.

See also
List of lakes in Finland

References

Landforms of Southwest Finland
Lakes of Salo, Finland